Baumgartsbrunn is a farmstead and settlement in the Khomas Region of central Namibia, situated on the C28 approximately  west of Windhoek.

Baumgartsbrunn known for the educational projects set up by Helmut Bleks, and after his death supported by the Helmut Bleks Foundation and other donors. Bleks, the farm owner in the 1970s, established a farm school, today the government boarding school Primary School Baumgartsbrunn, on the farm land in 1973.

In 1991 the Institute for Domestic Science & Agriculture, a vocational school for local women, was added. The school offers training for domestic workers but its qualifications are not accredited, a situation that has led to protests by the students. Namibia's ruling SWAPO party called for a take-over of the Helmut Bleks Foundation by the Namibian government.

Surrounding the school a small settlement has evolved over the years, mainly consisting of people from the ǀKhomanin clan of the Damara people.

References 

Populated places in the Khomas Region
Schools in Khomas Region
Farms in Namibia